Gastroplakaeis rubroanalis is a moth species in the family of Lasiocampidae found in Cameroon and Gabon.

This species has a wingspan of 64mm and a body length of 38mm.

Related pages
List of moths of Cameroon
List of moths of Gabon

References

External links

Moths of Africa
Lasiocampinae
Moths described in 1913